The 2019 GT4 European Series was the twelfth season of the GT4 European Series, a sports car championship created and organised by the Stéphane Ratel Organisation (SRO). The season began on 13 April at Monza and ended on 1 September at the Nürburgring.

Calendar
At the annual press conference during the 2018 24 Hours of Spa on 27 July, the Stéphane Ratel Organisation announced the first draft of the 2019 calendar, in which Barcelona-Catalunya initially made an appearance. It was dropped from the schedule and replaced by Zandvoort, when the finalised calendar was announced on 22 October.

Partners 
The GT4 European Series is supported by 5 sponsors. These are the tire manufacturer Pirelli, the lubricant specialist RAVENOL, the watch manufacturer CERTINA, Elf and Gullwing Racing Insurance.

Entry list

Race results
Bold indicates overall winner.

Championship standings
Scoring system
Championship points were awarded for the first ten positions in each race. Entries were required to complete 75% of the winning car's race distance in order to be classified and earn points. Individual drivers were required to participate for a minimum of 25 minutes in order to earn championship points in any race.

Drivers' championship

Teams' championship
Only the highest finishing car per team scored points and all other cars entered by that team were invisible as far as scoring points concerned. Only the highest ranked car in its respective category counted towards the championship. Parentheses indicate results that did not count towards the championship. Only two cars can be considered as forming the same team for the Teams' championship. If more than two cars are entered under the same competitor license, the competitor has to nominate the car numbers eligible to score points. Failure to do so will default the eligibility to score points to the two cars with the lowest car numbers. In several occasions full points were not awarded, because it is dependent on the number of teams participating per class.

See also
2019 ADAC GT4 Germany season
2019 French GT4 Cup
2019 GT4 South European Series

Notes

References

External links

GT4 European Series
GT4 European Series
GT4 European Series